Bangladesh Badminton Federation is the national organization for badminton and is responsible for governing the sport in Bangladesh. As of 2022, Abdul Malek is the president of the federation and Kabirul Islam Sikder is the general secretary.

History
Bangladesh Badminton Federation was established in 1972 after the Bangladesh Liberation war. Md. Yousuf Ali was the founding president of the organization and served till 1976.

The federation is headquartered at Shaheed Tajuddin Ahmed National Indoor Stadium, in Dhaka. In December 2020, they sought to limit use of the stadium by locking the electrical panels that power the main lights. General secretary Hossain said it was necessary to reduce their electric bill and maintenance costs.

In August 2021, Ekattor TV reported that the stadium was in disrepair. The courts had broken wooden floors which dipped when walking. During the quarter final 'Bangabandhu Bangladesh Games' in April, player Gazi Nur Alam Tushar tore a ligament, which the report blamed on the condition of the floors. The federation contributed towards Tushar's medical expenses.

References

Badminton in Bangladesh
National members of the Badminton World Federation
1972 establishments in Bangladesh
Sports organizations established in 1972
Badminton
Organisations based in Dhaka